1-Heptanol is an alcohol with a seven carbon chain and the structural formula of CH3(CH2)6OH. It is a clear colorless liquid that is very slightly soluble in water, but miscible with ether and ethanol.

Overview
There are three other isomers of heptanol that have a straight chain, 2-heptanol, 3-heptanol, and 4-heptanol, which differ by the location of the alcohol functional group.

Heptanol is commonly used in cardiac electrophysiology experiments to block gap junctions and increase axial resistance between myocytes. Increasing axial resistance will decrease conduction velocity and increase the heart's susceptibility to reentrant excitation and sustained arrhythmias. 

1-Heptanol has a pleasant smell and is used in cosmetics for its fragrance.

See also
 2-Heptanol
 3-Heptanol

References

Primary alcohols
Alkanols